Oliver Korittke (born 6 April 1968) is a German actor. He appeared in more than one hundred films since 1972. In Wilsberg he plays the role of Ekkehard Talkötter,  an official tax inspector.

Selected filmography

References

External links 

Oliver Korittke on AhoiAgency

1968 births
Living people
German male film actors
German male television actors
20th-century German male actors
21st-century German male actors